Ailsa Berk is a British dancer, actress, and puppeteer.

She is well known for playing Aslan on British television with William Todd-Jones in The Chronicles of Narnia television serial which was aired by the BBC from 1988 to 1990.

Berk has been a choreographer in a number of episodes of Doctor Who from 2005 to 2009. She has appeared on six episodes of Doctor Who Confidential and two episodes of Totally Doctor Who as herself.

Filmography/television work

Miscellaneous work
Doctor Who (40 +episodes) - choreographer 2005 - 2017
Doctor Who Confidential as herself (6 episodes, 2006–2008)
Totally Doctor Who as herself (2 episodes, 2007)
Max mon amour (1986 The role of Max )
Classic Creatures: Return of the Jedi (1983) (TV) (uncredited) as herself/Amanaman
Return of the Jedi (1983) (mime artist: "Amanaman")

External links
 http://ailsaberk.co.uk

Living people
British choreographers
British film actresses
British television actresses
Year of birth missing (living people)